Edward Lewis Farnsworth (January 8, 1863 – January 7, 1940) was an American politician in the state of Washington. He served in the Washington House of Representatives.

References

Democratic Party members of the Washington House of Representatives
1863 births
1940 deaths